Kings Bromley is a village and civil parish in Staffordshire, England on the junction of the A515 and the A513 roads. The village lies in Lichfield District, and the council ward of Kings Bromley had a population of 1,651 at the time of the 2001 census.  (although this area covers a few other small settlements in addition to the parish of Kings Bromley itself, including the villages of Hamstall Ridware and Elmhurst). The parish was in Offlow Hundred.

The population as of the 2011 census was measured at 1,163. The Norman village church, which dates back to at least 1170, is named All Saints.
The manor was anciently called Brom Legge, and derived its present name from the circumstances of its being the property of the Crown for nearly two centuries after the Norman conquest, previous to which it had been distinguished as the residence of the Earls of Mercia. Leofric, the husband of the famous Lady Godiva, died here in 1057. Henry III granted the manor to the Corbetts, who sold it, in 1569, to Francis Agard, of Ireland. About 1670 it was sold by Charles Agard to John Newton, of the island of Barbados, and in 1794 it was bequeathed by Sarah Newton to her cousins, John and Thomas Lane. South of Kings Bromley at Bromley Hayes is a marina on the Trent and Mersey Canal.

Spelling
The name of the village and parish seems to be spelled with or without the apostrophe fairly indiscriminately . Both King's Bromley and Kings Bromley are seen in official documents - the village's own website favours Kings Bromley .

Sport
Kings Bromley has a long-standing Football Club "Kings Bromley Swifts" which has images dating back as far as 1903 . In recent years "The Swifts" have played their football in the Burton Sunday League Division 1 but were promoted to the Premier Division in 2011/2012. Home games are played at Crawley Lane opposite Kings Bromley Cricket Club on the show field.

Crime 
In recent history , Kings Bromley has had a total of three raids in a single year . One of which was on national newspapers, this has led to police investigations in the matter . Despite all of this, the crime still continues , with the most recent raid on 26 March 2018 .

See also
Listed buildings in Kings Bromley

References

External links

 Official Parish Website
 GENUKI: Kings Bromley

Villages in Staffordshire
Civil parishes in Staffordshire